Alena Fomina and Valentina Ivakhnenko were the defending champions, but lost in the semifinals to Georgina García Pérez and Sara Sorribes Tormo.

Lucie Hradecká and Andreja Klepač won the title, defeating García Pérez and Sorribes Tormo in the final, 7–5, 3–6, [10–8].

Seeds

Draw

Draw

References
Main Draw

Al Habtoor Tennis Challenge - Doubles
Al Habtoor Tennis Challenge
2019 in Emirati tennis